A political family (also referred to as political dynasty) is a family in which multiple members are involved in politics — particularly electoral politics. Members may be related by blood or marriage; often several generations or multiple siblings may be involved.

A royal family or dynasty in a monarchy is generally considered to not be a "political family," although the later descendants of a royal family have played political roles in a republic (such as the Arslan family of Lebanon). A family dictatorship is a form of dictatorship that operates much like an absolute monarchy, yet occurs in a nominally republican state.

United States

In the United States, many political families (having at least two generations serving in political office) have arisen since the country's founding.

Presidential

Several presidential families produced multiple generations of members who devoted at least part of their working lives to public service.
The Adams family: John Adams, second U.S. president (1797–1801); his son, John Quincy Adams, sixth U.S. president (1825–29); John Quincy's son, Charles Francis Adams Sr., member of the U.S. House of Representatives from Massachusetts (1859–1861) and U.S. envoy to the United Kingdom (1861–68); Charles Francis' son, John Quincy Adams II, Massachusetts state representative (1866–67, 1868–69, 1871–72, 1874–75); John Quincy II's son, Charles Francis Adams III, mayor of Quincy, Massachusetts (1896–97) and U.S. secretary of the Navy (1929–33).
The Harrison family: Benjamin Harrison V, governor of Virginia (1781–84) and a signer of the Declaration of Independence; his son, William Henry Harrison, ninth U.S. president (1841); William's son, John Scott Harrison, member of the U.S. House of Representatives from Ohio (1853–57); John Scott's son, Benjamin Harrison, 23rd U.S. president (1889–1893) (the only grandson of a president to become president); Benjamin's son, Russell Benjamin Harrison, Indiana state legislator (1921–33) and diplomat (1908–27); Russell's son, William Henry Harrison III, member of the U.S. House of Representatives from Wyoming (1951–55, 1961–65, 1967–69).

The Lincoln family: Abraham Lincoln, postmaster of New Salem, Illinois (1833), Illinois state House of Representatives (1834–42), U.S. House of Representatives from Illinois (1847–49), 16th U.S. president (1861–65); his cousin-in-law, John Todd Stuart, U.S. House of Representatives from Illinois (1839–43, 1863–65), Illinois state Senate (1848–52); President Lincoln's son, Robert Todd Lincoln, South Chicago Board of Supervisors (1876–77), U.S. secretary of War (1881–85), U.S. minister to Great Britain (1889–93). Note: Abraham Lincoln and Levi Lincoln were fourth cousins; their great-great-grandfathers were brothers. Levi Lincoln served as a Massachusetts state legislator (1797–98), member of the U.S. House of Representatives (1800–01), U.S. attorney general and acting secretary of State in the Jefferson administration, lieutenant governor of Massachusetts (1807–08), and governor of Massachusetts (1808–09). 
The Taft family: Alphonso Taft, U.S. secretary of War (1876) and U.S. attorney general (1876–77); his sons, Charles Phelps Taft, U.S. House of Representatives from Ohio (1895–97), and William Howard Taft, 27th U.S. president (1909–13) and U.S. Supreme Court Chief Justice (1921–30); Charles and William Howard's cousin, Royal C. Taft, governor of Rhode Island (1888–1889); William Howard's sons, Robert A. Taft, U.S. Senate from Ohio (1939–53), and Charles Phelps Taft II, mayor of Cincinnati (1955–57); Robert's son, Robert Taft Jr., U.S. House of Representatives (1963–65, 1967–71) and U.S. Senate (1971–76) from Ohio; Charles II's son, Seth Taft, Cuyahoga County commissioner (1971–78); Robert Jr.'s son, Bob Taft, governor of Ohio (1999–2007).
The Roosevelt family: 26th U.S. President Theodore Roosevelt (1901–09) and 32nd U.S. President Franklin D. Roosevelt (1933–45), fifth cousins by blood (their great-great-great-grandfathers were brothers) and uncle-in-law and nephew-in-law by marriage. TR and FDR each served as U.S. assistant secretary of the Navy and as governor of New York before serving as president. FDR's wife and Theodore's niece, Eleanor Roosevelt, served as adviser to the president (1933–45), chair of the United Nations Commission on Human Rights (1946–52), chair of the Presidential Commission on the Status of Women (1961–62). TR's descendants: His son, Theodore Roosevelt Jr., governor of Puerto Rico (1929–32) and the Philippines (1932–33); Theodore Jr.'s son, Theodore Roosevelt III, Pennsylvania secretary of Commerce (1949–51). FDR and Eleanor's sons: Franklin D. Roosevelt Jr., U.S. House of Representatives from New York (1949–55), U.S. undersecretary of Commerce (1963–65); James Roosevelt, secretary to the President (1937–38), chairman of the California Democratic Party (1946–48), U.S. House of Representatives from California (1955–65); Elliott Roosevelt, mayor of Miami Beach, Florida (1965–67); James's sons, James Roosevelt, co-chair of the Rules and Bylaws Committee of the Democratic National Committee (1995 -), and Hall Delano Roosevelt, Long Beach, California, City Council (1996–2000).
The Kennedy family: Patrick Joseph Kennedy, Massachusetts state legislator (1884–95); his son, Joseph P. Kennedy Sr., chair of the U.S. Maritime Commission (1934–35) and the U.S. Securities and Exchange Commission (1937–38), and U.S. ambassador to Great Britain (1938–40. Joseph and Rose Kennedy's children included John F. Kennedy, 35th U.S. president (1961–63), U.S. House of Representatives (1947–53) and U.S. Senate (1953–61) from Massachusetts; Robert F. Kennedy, U.S. attorney general (1961–64) and U.S. Senate from New York (1965–68); Ted Kennedy, U.S. Senate from Massachusetts (1962–2009); and Jean Kennedy Smith, U.S. ambassador to Ireland (1993–98). Ted Kennedy's widow, Victoria Reggie Kennedy, is U.S. ambassador to Austria (2022–). Joseph and Rose Kennedy's grandchildren include Joseph P. Kennedy II, U.S. House of Representatives from Massachusetts (1987–99); Patrick J. Kennedy, U.S. House of Representatives from Rhode Island (1995–2011); Caroline Kennedy, U.S. ambassador to Japan (2013–17) and Australia (2022–); Kathleen Kennedy Townsend, lieutenant governor of Maryland (1995–2003); Mark Shriver, Maryland House of Delegates (1995–2003); Edward M. Kennedy Jr., Connecticut state senator (2015–19); and Bobby Shriver, City Council member and mayor of Santa Monica, California (2004–12). Maria Shriver was First Lady of California (2003–11) and founded the California Museum (her husband, Arnold Schwarzenegger, was governor). Joseph and Rose Kennedy's great-grandchildren include Joe Kennedy III, U.S. House of Representatives from Massachusetts (2013–21).

The Bush family: Prescott Bush, U.S. Senator from Connecticut (1952–63); his son, George H. W. Bush, 41st U.S. president (1989–93), U.S. vice president (1981–89), director of Central Intelligence Agency (1976–77), U.S. ambassador to the United Nations (1971–73), U.S. House of Representatives from Texas (1967–71); George H.W.'s sons, George W. Bush, 43rd U.S. president (2001–09) and governor of Texas (1995–2000), and Jeb Bush, governor of Florida (1995–2007); Jeb's son, George P. Bush, Texas Land Commissioner (2015–23).
The Clinton family: Bill Clinton, 42nd U.S. president (1993–2001) and governor of Arkansas (1979–81, 1983–92); his wife, Hillary Clinton, U.S. senator from New York (2001–09), U.S. secretary of State (2009–17), and Democratic nominee for President of the United States (2016); President Clinton's uncle, Roy Clinton, Arkansas state House of Representatives (1950s).

The Trump family: Donald Trump, 45th U.S. president (2017–21); his daughter Ivanka Trump and son-in-law Jared Kushner, senior presidential advisers (2017–21); his sister, Maryanne Trump Barry, U.S. district and appeals court judge (1983–2019); his fourth cousin, John Heinz, U.S. House of Representatives (1971–77) and U.S. Senate (1977–91) from Pennsylvania (their great-grandfathers were first cousins and originated from Kallstadt, Germany).
The Biden family: Joe Biden, 46th U.S. president (2021–), 47th U.S. vice president (2009–17), U.S. senator from Delaware (1973–2009); his son, Beau Biden, state attorney general of Delaware (2007–15). President Biden's great-grandfather, Edward Francis Blewitt, served as a Pennsylvania state senator (1907–10).

Two other presidents were related by blood: James Madison and Zachary Taylor were second cousins. Other presidents were related by marriage: George Washington's nephew, George Steptoe Washington, was Madison's brother-in-law. Dwight Eisenhower's grandson, David Eisenhower, married Julie Nixon, a daughter of Richard Nixon.

Other
The following political families are in the United States. For an extensive alphabetical list, see the article List of United States political families.
The Ashcroft family: John Ashcroft, governor of Missouri (1985–93), U.S. Senate from Missouri (1995–2001), U.S. attorney general (2001–05); his son, Jay Ashcroft, secretary of state of Missouri, (2017–).
The Bayh family: Birch Bayh, Indiana state House of Representatives (1954–62), U.S. Senate from Indiana (1963–81); his son, Evan Bayh, governor of Indiana (1989–97), U.S. Senate from Indiana (1999–2011).
The Beshear family: Steve Beshear, attorney general (1979–83), lieutenant governor (1983–87) and governor of Kentucky (2007–15); his son, Andy, attorney general (2016–19) and governor of Kentucky (2019–).
The Blunt family: Roy Blunt, U.S. House of Representatives (1997–2011) and U.S. Senate (2011–) from Missouri; his son, Matt Blunt, governor of Missouri (2005–09).
The Brown family: Pat Brown, governor of California (1959–67); his son, Jerry Brown, governor of California (1975–83, 2011–19), and mayor of Oakland (1999–2007); Jerry's sister, Kathleen Brown, member of the Los Angeles Board of Education, California State Treasurer (1991–95); Edmund Jr. and Kathleen's cousin, Hal Brown, Marin County Board of Supervisors.
The Brzezinski family: Zbigniew Brzezinski, U.S. National Security Advisor (1977–81); his son, Mark Brzezinski, U.S. ambassador to Sweden (2011–15), U.S. ambassador to Poland (2022–).
The Casey family: Bob Casey Sr., Pennsylvania Senate (1963–68), Auditor General of Pennsylvania (1969–77), governor of Pennsylvania (1987–95); his son, Bob Casey Jr., Auditor General of Pennsylvania (1997–2005), treasurer of Pennsylvania (2005–07), U.S. Senate from Pennsylvania (2007–); his younger brother, Patrick Casey, candidate for U.S. House of Representatives from Pennsylvania (1998, 2000).
The Celebrezze family: Frank D. Celebrezze, safety director for the City of Cleveland (1942–47), municipal court judge (1947–53); his brother, Anthony, mayor of Cleveland (1954–61), U.S. secretary of Health, Education and Welfare (1961–65), federal judge (1965–98); Frank's sons, Frank Jr., chief justice of the Ohio Supreme Court (1978–86), and James, Ohio state House of Representatives (1967–74); Anthony's son, Anthony Jr., Ohio state Senate (1975–78), secretary of state (1978–83), attorney general (1983–91); Frank Jr.'s son, Frank III, appeals court judge, Ohio Supreme Court justice; James's daughter, Leslie, judge, Cuyahoga County Court of Common Pleas (2009 – ); James' son, Nicholas, Ohio state House of Representatives (2012–19).
The Cheney family: Dick Cheney, U.S. House of Representatives from Wyoming (1979–89), U.S. secretary of Defense (1989–93), and 46th U.S. vice president (2001–09); his daughter, Liz Cheney, U.S. House of Representatives from Wyoming (2017–23).
The Cuomos: Mario Cuomo, governor of New York (1983–94); his son, Andrew Cuomo, U.S. secretary of Housing and Urban Development (1997–2001), governor of New York (2011–21).
The D'Alesandro/Pelosi family: Thomas D'Alesandro Jr., mayor of Baltimore, Maryland (1947–59), U.S. House of Representatives from Maryland (1939–47); his daughter, Nancy Pelosi, U.S. House of Representatives from California (1987–), speaker of the House (2007–11, 2019–23); her brother, Thomas D'Alesandro III, mayor of Baltimore (1967–71); Nancy's brother-in-law, Ronald Pelosi, San Francisco Board of Supervisors (1968–80); Ronald's nephew, Gavin Newsom, mayor of San Francisco (2004–11), lieutenant governor of California (2011–19), governor of California (2019–).
The Daley family: Richard J. Daley, mayor of Chicago (1955–76), widely considered one of the nation's most powerful mayors at the time; his sons, Richard M. Daley, mayor of Chicago (1989–2011); John P. Daley, Illinois state representative, state senator, and Cook County commissioner; William M. Daley, U.S. secretary of Commerce (1997–2000), White House chief of staff (2011–12).
The DeWine family: Mike DeWine, U.S. House of Representatives from Ohio (1983–91), U.S. Senate from Ohio (1995–2007), governor of Ohio (2019–); his son, Pat DeWine, justice of the Ohio Supreme Court (2017–).
The Dingell family: John Dingell Sr., U.S. House of Representatives from Michigan, (1933–55); his son, John Dingell, U.S. House of Representatives from Michigan (1955–2015); John's wife, Debbie Dingell, U.S. House of Representatives from Michigan (2015–) (the same seat has been represented by a member of the Dingell family continuously since 1933); John's son, Christopher D. Dingell, Michigan state senator (1987–2003); Michigan circuit court judge.
The Ellison family: Keith Ellison, U.S. House of Representatives from Minnesota (2007–19), Minnesota attorney general (2019–); his son, Jeremiah Ellison, Minneapolis City Council (2018–).
The Ford family: John Ford, Tennessee state Senate (1974–2005); his sister, Ophelia Ford, Tennessee state Senate (2005–14); brother, Emmitt Ford, Tennessee state House of Representatives (1975–81); brother, Harold Ford Sr., Tennessee state House of Representatives (1971–75), U.S. House of Representatives from Tennessee (1975–97); Harold's son, Harold Ford Jr., U.S. House of Representatives from Tennessee (1997–2007).
The Gilligan family: John J. Gilligan, U.S. House of Representatives (1965–67), governor of Ohio (1971–75); his daughter, Kathleen Sebelius, governor of Kansas (2003–09), U.S. secretary of Health and Human Services (2009–14).
The Gore family: Albert Gore Sr., U.S. House of Representatives (1939–53) and U.S. Senate (1953–71) from Tennessee; his son, Al Gore, U.S. House of Representatives (1977–85) and U.S. Senate from Tennessee (1985–93), 45th U.S. vice president (1993–2001).
The Hanna family: Mark Hanna, U.S. Senate from Ohio (1896–1904), chairman of the Republican National Committee (1897–1904); his daughter Ruth Hanna McCormick, U.S. House of Representatives from Illinois (1929–31).
The Huckabee family: Mike Huckabee, lieutenant governor (1993–96) and governor (1996–2007) of Arkansas; his daughter, Sarah Huckabee Sanders, White House press secretary (2017–19), governor of Arkansas (2023–).
The Jones family: Walter B. Jones Sr., Democrat, U.S. House of Representatives from North Carolina (1966–1992); his son, Walter B. Jones Jr., Republican, U.S. House of Representatives from North Carolina (1995–2019).
The Key family: Annie L. Key, Ohio state House of Representatives (2001–06); her daughter, Stephanie Howse, Ohio state House of Representatives (2015–22), Cleveland City Council (2022–). 
The Kyl family: John Henry Kyl, U.S. House of Representatives from Iowa (1959–65, 1967–73); his son, Jon Kyl, U.S. House of Representatives (1987–95) and U.S. Senate from Arizona (1995–2013, 2018).
The Landrieu family: Moon Landrieu, Louisiana state House of Representatives (1960–66), mayor of New Orleans (1970–78), U.S. secretary of Housing and Urban Development (1979–81); his daughter, Mary Landrieu, Louisiana state House of Representatives (1980–88), Louisiana state treasurer (1988–96), U.S. Senate from Louisiana (1997–2015); her brother, Mitch Landrieu Louisiana state representative (1988–2004), lieutenant governor of Louisiana (2004–10), mayor of New Orleans (2010–18), senior adviser to President Biden for infrastructure coordination (2021–).
The LaTourette family: Steve LaTourette, U.S. House of Representatives from Ohio (1995–2013); his daughter, Sarah LaTourette, Ohio state House of Representatives (2015–19).
The Levin family: Sander Levin, U.S. House of Representatives from Michigan (1983–2019); his brother, Carl Levin, U.S. Senate from Michigan (1979–2015); Sander's son, Andy Levin, U.S. House of Representatives from Michigan (2019–).
The Lippitt/Chafee family: Henry Lippitt, governor of Rhode Island (1875–77); his sons, Charles W. Lippitt, governor of Rhode Island (1895–97), and Henry F. Lippitt, U.S. Senate from Rhode Island (1911–17); Henry F.'s son, Frederick Lippitt, Rhode Island state House of Representatives (1961–83); the elder Henry's great-grandson, John Chafee, governor of Rhode Island (1963–69), U.S. secretary of the Navy (1969–72), U.S. Senate from Rhode Island (1976–99); John's son, Lincoln Chafee, mayor of Warwick, Rhode Island (1993–99), U.S. Senate from Rhode Island (1999–2007), governor of Rhode Island (2011–15).
The Lodge family: Henry Cabot Lodge, U.S. House of Representatives (1887–93) and U.S. Senate (1893–1924) from Massachusetts; his grandson, Henry Cabot Lodge Jr., U.S. Senate from Massachusetts (1947–53), U.S. ambassador to the United Nations (1953–60), South Vietnam (1963–64, 1965–67), West Germany (1968–69), Vatican City (1970–77); Henry Jr.'s brother, John Davis Lodge, U.S. House of Representatives from Connecticut (1947–51), (governor of Connecticut (1951–55), and U.S. ambassador to Spain (1955–61), Argentina (1969–73), Switzerland (1983–85).
The Long family: Huey Long, governor of Louisiana (1928–32), U.S. Senate from Louisiana (1932–35); his widow, Rose McConnell Long, U.S. Senate from Louisiana (1936–37); his brother, Earl Long, lieutenant governor (1936–39) and governor (1939–40, 1948–52, 1956–60) of Louisiana; brother, George S. Long, U.S. House of Representatives from Louisiana (1953–58); Huey Long's son, Russell B. Long, U.S. Senate from Louisiana (1948–87). See Long family.
The Lujan family: Eugene David Lujan, associate justice, New Mexico Supreme Court (1945–59); his granddaughter, Michelle Lujan Grisham, governor of New Mexico (2022–); Eugene's second cousin, Ben Luján, member (1975–2012) and speaker (2001–12), New Mexico state House of Representatives; Ben's son, Ben Ray Luján, U.S. Senate from New Mexico (2021–); Eugene's fifth cousin, Manuel Lujan Sr., mayor of Santa Fe (1942–48). Manuel's son, Manuel Lujan Jr., U.S. House of Representatives from New Mexico (1969–89), U.S. Secretary of the Interior (1989–1993). 
The Mack family: Connie Mack III, U.S. House of Representatives (1983–89) and U.S. Senate (1989–2001) from Florida; his son, Connie Mack IV, Florida state House of Representatives (2001–03) and U.S. House of Representatives from Florida (2005–13); Mary Bono, Connie IV's then-wife, member of the U.S. House of Representatives from California (1998–2013).
The Mathews family: George Mathews, governor of Georgia (1787–88, 1793–96), U.S. House of Representatives from Georgia (1789–91); his brothers, Sampson and Archer, served in the Virginia General Assembly. Their descendants served as governors, judges and legislators in five states. 
The Moore/Capito family: Arch A. Moore Jr., U.S. House of Representatives (1957–1969), governor of West Virginia (1969–1977; 1985–1989); his daughter Shelley Moore Capito, U.S. House of Representatives (2001–2015), U.S. Senate (2015–); her son Moore Capito, West Virginia House of Delegates (2016–); his cousin Riley Moore, West Virginia House of Delegates (2017–2019), West Virginia state treasurer (2021–)
The Murkowski family: Frank Murkowski, U.S. Senate from Alaska (1981–2002), governor of Alaska (2002–06); his daughter, Lisa Murkowski, Alaska state House of Representatives (1999–2002), U.S. Senate from Alaska (2002–).
The O'Neill family: Thomas O'Neill, Cambridge, Massachusetts City Council; his son, Tip O'Neill, Massachusetts House of Representatives (1937–53), U.S. House of Representatives from Massachusetts (1953–87), Speaker of the U.S. House of Representatives (1977–87); Tip's son Thomas P. O'Neill III, lieutenant governor of Massachusetts (1975–83).
The Paul family: Ron Paul, U.S. House of Representatives from Texas (1976–77, 1979–85, 1997–2013); his son. Rand Paul, U.S. Senate from Kentucky (2011 -).
The Payne/Bolton family: Henry B. Payne, Ohio state Senate (1849–52), U.S. House of Representatives (1875–77) and U.S. Senate (1885–91) from Ohio; his son, Nathan P. Payne, mayor of Cleveland (1875–76); Henry's granddaughter, Frances P. Bolton, U.S. House of Representatives from Ohio (1940–69); her husband, Chester C. Bolton, U.S. House of Representatives from Ohio (1929–37); their son, Oliver P. Bolton, U.S. House of Representatives from Ohio (1953–57, 1963–65).
The Pence family: Mike Pence, 48th U.S. vice president (2017–21), governor of Indiana (2013–17), U.S. House of Representatives from Indiana (2001–13); his brother, Greg Pence, U.S. House of Representatives from Indiana (2019–).
The Rockefeller family: Nelson Rockefeller, 41st Vice President of the United States (1974–77), Governor of New York (1959–73); his brother, Winthrop Rockefeller, Governor of Arkansas (1967–71); their nephew, Jay Rockefeller, governor of West Virginia (1987–85), U.S. Senate from West Virginia (1985–2015); Winthrop's son, Winthrop Paul Rockefeller, lieutenant governor of Arkansas (1996–2006).
The Romney family: George W. Romney, governor of Michigan (1963–69), U S. secretary of Housing and Urban Development (1969–73); his son, Mitt Romney, governor of Massachusetts (2003–07), Republican Party nominee for U.S. president (2012), U.S. Senate from Utah (2019–); Mitt's niece, Ronna McDaniel, chair of the Republican National Committee (2017–), delegate to Republican National Convention (2016), chair of the Michigan Republican Party (2015–17).
The Rooney family: Dan M. Rooney (Pittsburgh Steelers owner and Pro Football Hall of Fame inductee), U.S. ambassador to Ireland (2009–12); his nephews, Tom Rooney, U.S. House of Representatives from Florida (2009–19), and Patrick Rooney Jr., Florida state House of Representatives (2010–16). 
The Scalia family: Antonin Scalia, U.S. Supreme Court Justice (1986–2016); his son, Eugene Scalia, U.S. Secretary of Labor (2019–21).
The Sununu family: John H. Sununu, governor of New Hampshire (1983–89), White House chief of staff (1989–91); his sons John E. Sununu, U.S. House of Representatives (1997-03) and U.S. Senate (2003–09) from New Hampshire, and Chris Sununu, New Hampshire Executive Council (2011–17), governor of New Hampshire (2017–).
The Sykes family: Vernon Sykes, Ohio state Senate (2017–), Ohio state House of Representatives (1983–2000, 2007–14), Akron City Council (1970s–83); his wife, Barbara Sykes, Ohio state House of Representatives (2001–06), Akron City Council (1990s–2001); their daughter, Emilia Sykes, Ohio state House of Representatives (2015–2022), U.S. House of Representatives (2023–).
The Udall family: David King Udall Sr., representative to the Arizona Territorial Legislature (1899). His sons: Jesse Addison Udall, Arizona state House of Representatives (1931–38), chief justice of the Arizona Supreme Court (1964); John Hunt Udall, mayor of Phoenix, Arizona (1936–38); Don Taylor Udall, Arizona state House of Representatives (1941–42); Levi Stewart Udall, Arizona Supreme Court (1947–60), chief justice (1951–53, 1957–59). Levi's sons: Stewart Udall, U.S. House of Representatives from Arizona (1955–61), U.S. Secretary of the Interior (1961–69); Mo Udall, U.S. House of Representatives from Arizona (1961–91). Next generation: John Nicholas Udall, son of John, mayor of Phoenix, Arizona (1948–52); Tom Udall, son of Stewart, U.S. House of Representatives (1999–2008), U S. Senate from New Mexico (2009–21), U.S. ambassador to New Zealand and Samoa (2021–); Mark Udall, son of Mo, U.S. House of Representatives (1999–2009) and U.S. Senate from Colorado (2009–15), Colorado state House of Representatives (1997–99).
The Zone family: Michael Zone, Cleveland City Council (1960–74); his wife, Mary Zone, Cleveland City Council (1974–86); their son, Matt Zone, Cleveland City Council (2001–); their son-in-law, Lee Fisher, Ohio state House of Representatives (1981–82), Ohio state Senate (1983–90), Ohio state attorney general (1991–95), lieutenant governor of Ohio (2007–11); their nephew, Joseph Zone, Cleveland Municipal Court judge.

United Kingdom

The Pitt family: both William Pitt, 1st Earl of Chatham and his son William Pitt the Younger were Prime Ministers of Great Britain. 
The Cavendish family: William Cavendish, 4th Duke of Devonshire was Prime Minister from 1756 to 1757. His great-great-granddaughter, Dorothy Macmillan, was married to Harold Macmillan, who served as Prime Minister from 1957 to 1963.

The Chamberlain family: Joseph Chamberlain served as President of the Board of Trade, Secretary of State for the Colonies, and (briefly in 1906) Leader of the Opposition. He had two sons by different wives, who both served in public office: the elder, Austen Chamberlain, served first as Chancellor of the Exchequer and later as Foreign Secretary; while the younger, Neville Chamberlain, was Prime Minister from 1937 to 1940.
The Churchill family: Lord Randolph Churchill served as Leader of the House of Commons and Chancellor of the Exchequer in 1886–87. His son Winston Churchill held numerous political posts including President of the Board of Trade, Chancellor of the Exchequer and Foreign Secretary before finally becoming Prime Minister (1940–1945 and 1951–1955). Winston's son Randolph and grandsons Winston and Nicholas were also politicians.
The Foot family: Isaac Foot was an MP from 1922 to 1935. Three of his sons also followed him into politics: the eldest son, Dingle, was Solicitor General for England and Wales under Harold Wilson; the third son, John, stood unsuccessfully as a Liberal candidate; and the fourth son, Michael, was Leader of the Opposition from 1979 to 1983,
The Hogg family: Both Douglas Hogg, 1st Viscount Hailsham and his son Quintin Hogg, 2nd Viscount Hailsham & Baron Hailsham of St Marylebone served as Lord Chancellor. Quintin's son Douglas Hogg, 3rd Viscount Hailsham is a politician and he is married to the political advisor Sarah Hogg, Baroness Hogg.
The Kinnock family: Current Labour MP Stephen Kinnock is the son of Neil Kinnock, Leader of the Opposition from 1983 to 1992. Stephen is also married to Helle Thorning-Schmidt, former Prime Minister of Denmark.
The Paisley family: Reverend Ian Paisley and his wife Eileen Paisley were both Democratic Unionist MPs, as is their son, Ian Paisley Jr.
The Johnson family: Stanley Johnson was a Member of the European Parliament from 1979 until 1984. Two of his sons followed him into politics: the eldest, Boris, was Mayor of London from 2008 to 2012 and Prime Minister from 2019 to 2022; while the youngest, Jo, also served as an MP.

India

In India, three members of the Nehru–Gandhi family (Jawaharlal Nehru, Indira Gandhi and Rajiv Gandhi) have served as Prime Minister of India. Rajiv's wife Sonia Gandhi and son, Rahul Gandhi served as the President of Indian National Congress.
 Three members of the Abdullah Family of Kashmir have served as the Chief Minister of Jammu and Kashmir.
 Two members of the Yadav Family (Mulayam Singh Yadav and Akhilesh Yadav) of Uttar Pradesh have served as Chief Minister of Uttar Pradesh and many have held positions as ministers in the state government(UP) and the Indian government.
 Two members of the M. Karunanidhi family have served as Chief Minister, including his son M.K. Stalin and many more, including children, grandchildren and other relatives have held various ministerial positions in both state and central government.

Other countries
In Azerbaijan, President Ilham Aliyev is the son of the late Heydar Aliyev, who also served as the president from 1993 to 2003. Ilham's wife Mehriban is also the vice president of Azerbaijan and the first person to hold the position following its creation in 2017. 
In Canada, Prime Minister Justin Trudeau is the son of the late Pierre Trudeau, who also served as prime minister.
In Brazil, Jair Bolsonaro served as President from 2019 to 2023 and also served as federal deputy from 1991 to 2018. Flavio Bolsonaro, his firstborn son, serves as Senator since 2019, and has also served as state deputy for Rio de Janeiro from 2003 till 2018. Eduardo Bolsonaro, second son, serves as Federal Deputy since 2015. His third son, Carlos Bolsonaro serves in the Rio de Janeiro city council since 2001. His ex wife, Ana Cristina Valle, ran for office in 2018, but was not elected.
In Greece, the Papandreou family has been a predominant figure in Greek politics since the end of World War II. Georgios Papandreou served three terms as prime minister, starting in 1944, on a political career that spanned five decades. His son, Andreas Papandreou, regarded as one of the greatest modern prime ministers of the country, also served three terms as prime minister, starting in 1981. George Papandreou, Andreas' son and Georgios' grandson, served in the same role from 2009 to 2011. Another important political family is the Mitsotakis family. Current Prime Minister Kyriakos Mitsotakis is the son of former Prime Minister Konstantinos Mitsotakis, brother of former Minister of Foreign Affairs Dora Bakoyannis, and uncle of current Mayor of Athens Kostas Bakoyannis.
The French Front National Party is led by Marine Le Pen, who succeeded her father Jean-Marie Le Pen in early 2011.
In Indonesia, Sukarno and his daughter Megawati both served as presidents. Megawati's daughter, Puan Maharani is currently serving as the Speaker of the People's Representative Council.
In the Republic of Ireland, it is common for several members of a family to hold political office; see Families in the Oireachtas for a full list. This is particularly present in the two establishment centre-right parties, Fianna Fáil and Fine Gael.
In Japan, various families dominate the political scene, several of which have occupied the prime ministership. Such instances include Shinzo Abe, who served from 2012 to 2020 and from 2006 to 2007, and who is the grandson of Nobusuke Kishi, who served from 1957 to 1960, and the great-nephew of Eisaku Sato, who served from 1964 to 1972. Additionally, both Kishi and Sato are brothers. There are other notable examples including Yukio Hatoyama (2009–2010), grandson of Ichiro Hatoyama (1954–1956), Morihiro Hosokawa (1993–1994), grandson of Fumimaro Konoe (1937 – 1939 & 1940 – 1941), Taro Aso (2008–2009), grandson of Shigeru Yoshida and (1946 – 1947, 1948 – 1954) and son-in-law of Zenko Suzuki (1980–1982) and Yasuo Fukuda (2007–2008), son of Takeo Fukuda (1976–1978).
In Kazakhstan, Nursultan Nazarbayev served as president of Kazakhstan from 1991 to 2019, while his daughter Dariga served as Chair of the Senate from 2019 to 2020 and leader of her father's political party Nur Otan in the Senate from 2014 to 2015.
Uhuru Kenyatta served as president of Kenya from 2013 to 2022. He is the son of Jomo Kenyatta, the first president of the Republic of Kenya, who left office in 1978.
In Latvia, Guntis Ulmanis, who served as president from 1993 to 1999, is the great-nephew of Kārlis Ulmanis, who also served as president.
In Lebanon, Saad Hariri, who served as prime minister of Lebanon from 2009 to 2011 and from 2016 to 2020, is the son of Rafic Hariri, who also served as prime minister from 1992 to 1994 and from 2000 to 2004. The Gemayel family also plays a prominent role in the Lebanese politics. Bachir and Amine Gemayel, both of whom were elected presidents of Lebanon, are sons of Pierre Gemayel, the founder of the Kataeb Party.
Landsbergis of Lithuania: Vytautas Landsbergis, leader of the State in 1990–1992, is the son of Vytautas Landsbergis-Žemkalnis, a member of the government in the 1940s. Grandson Gabrielius Landsbergis is the current leader of the Conservative Party and the Minister of Foreign Affairs.
In Malaysia, Abdul Razak Hussein served as Prime Minister from 1970 to 1976 and his son Najib Razak also served as Prime Minister from 2009 to 2018. Abdul's brother-in-law Hussein Onn also served as Prime Minister from 1976 to 1981. 
In Mexico, former president Enrique Peña Nieto, who served from 2012 to 2018, is a cousin of Alfredo Del Mazo Maza, governor of the State of Mexico, who is at the same time a son of former governor Alfredo del Mazo González. President Peña Nieto is also related to former governor Salvador Sánchez Colin and former governor Arturo Montiel Rojas. Prominent Mexican politician Luis Calderón Vega, founder of the National Action Party, is father of former senator Luisa María Calderón and former president Felipe Calderón, who is married to former congresswoman and presidential candidate Margarita Zavala, who is herself cousin of congresswoman Mariana Gómez del Campo. Former presidents Miguel de la Madrid and Miguel Alemán Valdés also had sons who held prominent political positions, Enrique de la Mardrid served as Secretary of Tourism under president Enrique Peña Nieto, while Miguel Alemán Velasco served as senator and governor of Veracruz. However the most notable political family in Mexico is perhaps the Ruiz Massieu-Salinas Family. Former senator and Minister of Urban Development, Raúl Salinas Lozano is father to  Carlos Salinas de Gortari who served as President of Mexico between 1988 and 1994, Raúl Salinas de Gortari, former director of CONASUPO, and Adriana Salinas de Gortari, who was herself married to former governor and PRI General Secretary, José Francisco Ruíz Massieu, killed in 1994. Ruíz Massieu's daughter, Claudia Ruíz Massieu would go on to become Mexico's Secretary of Tourism and Secretary of Forgein Affairs. 
In Nigeria, members of the Ransome-Kuti family have been prominent. Olikoye Ransome-Kuti served as the health minister under President Ibrahim Babangida while his brother, Fela Kuti, founded and led the Movement of the People political party. Their mother, Chief Funmilayo Ransome-Kuti, was a founding mother of Nigeria who served as a lawmaker and party leader in the country's colonial era.
In Palau, former President Thomas Remengesau Jr. is the son of the 2nd President Thomas Remengesau Sr.
In the Philippines, two members of the Aquino family (originating from Tarlac) had served as president, Corazon Aquino (who served from 1986 – 1992) and her son Benigno Aquino III (who served from 2010 – 2016). The Macapagal family also had two members who served as president, Diosdado Macapagal (who served from 1961 – 1965) and his daughter Gloria Macapagal Arroyo (who served from 2001 – 2010). Later the Marcos family, known for its kleptocratic rule, would have two presidents: Ferdinand Sr. (who served from 1965 until his removal in 1986) and his namesake son, Ferdinand Jr., widely known as "Bongbong", who has currently been serving since 2022. The family also produced a senator, Ferdinand Sr.'s daughter Imee who has been serving since 2019.
In Portugal, the minister of welfare state is married with a member of parliament involved in a scandal related with an ONG financed by the welfare state; The daughter of the same minister is the presidency minister; The interior minister is married with the sea minister; the justice minister husband was nominated for a public commission by a co-minister.
In Singapore, Prime Minister Lee Hsien Loong is the son of the first Prime Minister of Singapore Lee Kuan Yew.
In South Africa, the last State President, F. W. de Klerk, is the son of Jan de Klerk who served as acting State President in April 1975.
In South Korea, both Park Geun-hye and her father, Park Chung-hee, were Presidents of South Korea.
In Sri Lanka, the Rajapaksa family has had 2 presidents and 1 prime minister. Also, the family has many of their extended relatives in the parliament. Additionally, the Bandaranaike family has had 1 president and 3 prime ministers with S. W. R. D. Bandaranaike, Sirimavo Bandaranaike and Chandrika Kumaratunga all serving in the Prime Minister's capacity with Chandrika Kumaratunga serving as President. 
In Taiwan, Chiang Kai-shek and Chiang Ching-kuo both served as President
In Thailand, siblings Thaksin and Yingluck Shinawatra both served as Prime Minister 
In Turkmenistan, Serdar Berdimuhamedow, who was elected as president of Turkmenistan in 2022, is the son of Gurbanguly Berdimuhamedow, who served as president from 2007 to 2022.
In Iran, the Davidkhanian family has been prominent in Persian politics and diplomacy, giving the country numerous cabinet ministers, advisors to the Shah, and politicians since the establishment of the Qajar dynasty. Markar Khan Davidkhanian served as the Minister of Finance (1804–1848) and advisor to Fath-Ali Shah Qajar during the Great Game. Set Khan Astvatsatourian (1780–1942) served as a political advisor to Abbas Mirza and Ambassador to Britain. Tsatur Khan (1820–1905) served as advisor to Mozaffar-ad-Din Qajar, envoy to Russia, and de facto Minister of Foreign Affairs. During the Pahlavi era, Meguertitch Khan Davidkhanian (1902–1983) served as Governor of Khorramshahr. 
Hoping to prevent political dynasties, the Indonesian parliament, which represents the third largest democracy in the world, passed a law barring anyone holding a major office within five years of a relative.

See also
List of political families
Hereditary politicians
Nepotism
Oligarchy

References

 
Oligarchy